Princess Changshan is the formal title of a daughter of the regent of the state of Cao Wei, Sima Zhao. Her personal name is unknown.

Biography
Princess Changshan is recorded as having been blind in both eyes, though it is unclear from the texts whether this was congenital or developed over time. She was the sister of Emperor Wu of Jin and the primary wife of the official Wang Ji (王濟), who is recorded as having greatly favoured her.

When Emperor Wu of Jin ordered their brother, the Prince of Qi, from the capital to a vassal state in 282 CE, Princess Changshan petitioned the emperor to allow him to stay. She was joined by her sister, the Princess Jingzhao. The emperor was furious and scolded Wang Ji for having sent women to cry in front of him. He demoted Wang for lacking in filial piety, who then moved to live north of Mt Mang near Luoyang, Hebei. The historical records do not mention if Princess Changshan accompanied him.

Princess Changshan had no sons, but was considered the formal mother of Wang's two sons by his concubines. While the eldest son inherited the rank of Wang's father, the second son Wang Yu inherited Princess Changshan's rank and received the title Marquis Minyang.

See also 
Women in ancient and imperial China

References

Notes

Works cited

Jin dynasty (266–420) people
Jin dynasty (266–420) imperial princes
Year of birth unknown
Year of death unknown
Blind royalty and nobility
Chinese blind people
Ancient Chinese princesses
3rd-century Chinese women
3rd-century Chinese people